The Kinchega National Park is a protected national park that is located in the Far West region of New South Wales, in eastern Australia.The  national park is located approximately  west of Sydney and  south-east of . The eastern edge of the Kinchega National Park is formed by the Darling River.

The park is noted for its Aboriginal artefacts, left behind by the Paarkantji people, who travelled up and down the Darling River.

Fauna 
It is home to many species of wild animals, such as lace monitor, Peron's tree frog, pink and black cockatoos, kultarr and others.

See also

 Protected areas of New South Wales

References

National parks of New South Wales
Protected areas established in 1967
1967 establishments in Australia
Far West (New South Wales)